"Goin' Home" is a song recorded by the English rock band the Rolling Stones. Written by Mick Jagger and Keith Richards, it was the longest popular music song at the time, coming in at 11 minutes and 35 seconds, and was the first extended rock improvisation released by a major recording act. It was included as the sixth track on side one of the United Kingdom version and the fifth track on side two of the American version of the band's 1966 studio album Aftermath.

Writing and recording 
"Goin Home" was written by Mick Jagger and Keith Richards, and recorded at RCA Studios in Hollywood from 8 to 10 December 1965. The recording is a long blues-inspired track that is notable as one of the first songs by a rock and roll band to break the ten-minute mark and the longest recorded song on any Stones album. While many bands had stretched a song's duration in live performances, and Bob Dylan was known to write long songs (such as Highlands), "Goin' Home" was the first "jam" recorded expressly for an album. In an interview with the magazine Rolling Stone, Richards said:

Jack Nitzsche, a regular Stones contributor throughout the 1960s, here performs percussion.

The song, while lengthy, is built around a common theme, as opposed to later Stones songs of great length like "Midnight Rambler" or "Can't You Hear Me Knocking" which are divided into distinct sections punctuated by differing instrumentations. "Goin' Home" plays as a long jam, eventually deconstructing Richards' guitar piece, Jagger's lyrics, and Watts' drum lines which build in power as the song progresses. Jagger's lyrics are called "a basic expression of [his] pining for his girl and determining to go home and get him some. It's the bumpety-bump, ascending chorus of announcing his intentions to go home that's the most 'pop' element of the song." A bitter-sweet ending is in the final lyrics: "Come on, little girl, you may look sweet, but I know you ain't".

Legacy 
According to the music historian Nicholas Schaffner, at 11 minutes and 35 seconds, "Goin' Home" displaced the 1965 Bob Dylan song "Desolation Row" (11:21) as the longest recording in popular music. He also cites it as "the first extended improvisation released by a major rock group—though by no means the last."

Personnel

According to authors Philippe Margotin and Jean-Michel Guesdon, except where noted:

The Rolling Stones
Mick Jagger vocals
Keith Richards lead guitar, rhythm guitar
Brian Jones harmonica
Bill Wyman bass
Charlie Watts brushed bass drum

Additional musicians
Ian Stewart piano
Jack Nitzsche tambourine

Notes

Sources

External links
 Complete Official Lyrics

The Rolling Stones songs
1966 songs
Songs written by Jagger–Richards
Song recordings produced by Andrew Loog Oldham